Eunice do Monte Lima Katunda (Catunda) (14 March 1915 – 3 August 1990) was a Brazilian  pianist, music educator and composer.

Life
Katunda was born in Rio de Janeiro and studied piano with Oscar Guanabarino and Marieta Lion, composition with Furio Franceschini, Camargo Guarnieri and Hans-Joachim Koellreutter. Beginning in 1944, she worked as a concert pianist and was a member of the Música Viva ensemble founded by Koellreutter. In 1948, together with students of Koellreutter, Katunda travels to Italy, where she will study conducting with Hermann Scherchen. From this year, Eunice approaches the aesthetic socialist guidelines. In 1950 she began the study of Brazilian folk music with Pierre Verger. Katunda taught musicology at the University of Brasília and composition at the Rio de Janeiro Conservatory. She died in São José dos Campos.

Works
Katunda often combined folk element with 12-note technique. Selected compositions include:
A Flauta  (in Duas líricas gregas)
Anunciação (in Canções à maneira de época) (Text: Vinícius de Moraes)
Aóion (in Duas líricas gregas)
Assim como as folhas (in Canções à maneira de época) (Text: Vinícius de Moraes)
Bom Jesus do Calvário (in Duas devoções nordestinas)
Consciência de ser (in Estro Romântico) (Text: Eunice Katunda)
Dialética (in Estro Romântico) (Text: Vinícius de Moraes)
Encomenda de Almas (in Duas devoções nordestinas)
Estro africano n.2 (Águas de Oxalá) (Text: Bible or other Sacred Texts)
Incelença das Ave-Marias (in Quatro Incelenças (Quatro cantigas de velório))
Incelenças do anjo do céu (in Quatro Incelenças (Quatro cantigas de velório))
Incelenças do anjo-Serafim (in Quatro Incelenças (Quatro cantigas de velório))
Incelenças dos cravos e rosas (in Quatro Incelenças (Quatro cantigas de velório))
Louvor de Oxum (in Estro africano n.1 (Duas cantigas das águas)) (Text: Bible or other Sacred Texts)
Louvor de Yemanjá (in Estro africano n.1 (Duas cantigas das águas)) (Text: Bible or other Sacred Texts)
Moda da solidão-solitude (in Líricas brasileiras) (Text: Mário de Andrade)
Moda do corajoso (in Líricas brasileiras) (Text: Mário de Andrade)
Não comerei (in Canções à maneira de época) (Text: Vinícius de Moraes)
O anjo das pernas tortas (in Canções à maneira de época) (Text: Vinícius de Moraes)
O espectro da rosa (in Canções à maneira de época) (Text: Vinícius de Moraes)
O mais que perfeito (in Canções à maneira de época) (Text: Vinícius de Moraes)
O sono da amada (in Estro Romântico) (Text: Vinícius de Moraes)
Pois que tão raramente (in Duas líricas gregas)
Prenúncio do Sol (in Duas líricas gregas)
Refrão de infância (in Canções à maneira de época) (Text: Vinícius de Moraes)
Rosa dos quatro espinhos (in Estro Romântico) (Text: Eunice Katunda)
Ser subjetivo (in Canções à maneira de época) (Text: Vinícius de Moraes)
Seresta do maior amor (Text: Vinícius de Moraes)
Sono una creatura (in Due lirici di Ungaretti) (Text: Giuseppe Ungaretti)
Teu nome (in Canções à maneira de época) (Text: Vinícius de Moraes)
Trenoda al poeta morto (Text: Giuseppe Ungaretti)
'Negrinho do pastoreio cantata for 3vv, flute, guitar, percussion, 1946
Cantata do soldado morto, chorus, small orchestra, 1965
Cantata dos marinheiros, chorus, orchestra, 1975
4 cantos à morte, 1948
A negrinha e Iemanjá, chorus, orchestra, 1955
Pianoforte Concerto, 1955
Homenagem a Schoenberg, clarinet, viola, violincello, piano, 1949
Serestas, 4 sax, 1956
2 serestas, guitar, 1972
Momento de Lorca, for piano, 1957
4 momentos de Rilke, for piano, 1958
Sonata de louvação, for piano, 1960
Sonata fúnebre, for piano, 1970

References

1915 births
1990 deaths
20th-century classical composers
Brazilian music educators
Women classical composers
Brazilian classical composers
Women music educators
20th-century women composers